The American Jobs Creation Act of 2004 was a federal tax act that repealed the export tax incentive (ETI), which had been declared illegal by the World Trade Organization several times and sparked retaliatory tariffs by the European Union. It also contained numerous tax credits for agricultural and business institutions as well as the repeal of excise taxes on both fuel and alcohol and the creation of tax credits for biofuels.

The bill was introduced by Representative Bill Thomas on June 4, 2004, passed the House June 17, the Senate on July 15, and was signed by President George W. Bush on October 22.

Summary of provisions

The Office of Tax Analysis of the United States Department of the Treasury summarized the tax changes as follows:
 created deduction for income from U.S. production activities
 repealed exclusion for extraterritorial income
 changed interest expense allocation rules

A report by the Tax Policy Center identifies the following main provisions and their costs over a period of 10 years:
 repeal of the ETI over a 3 year period including transitional relief; expected to produce $49 billion in revenue
 U.S. production tax breaks of 9% of income from domestic production, with an expected cost of $77 billion
 assorted business tax relief provisions costing $7 billion
 international tax changes for a cost of $43 billion
 miscellaneous revenue generating provisions with a projected gain of $82 billion
 temporarily allowed taxpayer deduction of state and local sales taxes

Another provision revised the definition of the term "covered expatriate" which sets net worth andi income tax liability thresholds used to determine if a person who renounces his/her U.S. citizenship must pay an expatriation tax.

See also
 Extraterritorial income exclusion
 Foreign Sales Corporation
 Domestic international sales corporation

References

External links
 Full text of the Act

United States federal taxation legislation
Acts of the 108th United States Congress
Presidency of George W. Bush
2004 in economics